Heroes is an album, by Denise Ho, released on October 8, 2009, the day before her concert “SUPERGOO’ at the Hong Kong Coliseum started. It's almost a year after her last album Ten Days in the Madhouse, her 2009 new album titled Heroes, backed by her songwriting partners Wyman Wong, Hanjin Tan, and her older brother, Harris Ho, Denise offers 10 new songs intended to empower listeners to find the superheroes within themselves and share the positive energy of each other. Main cuts on the album include the chart-topping first plug The Old Testament ("舊約"), and the concert’s theme song The Diamond Sutra ("金剛經"). The bonus music video DVD for this couple of songs are also included.

Track listing
 Instrumental 1
 舊約 ("The Old Testament")
 飛簷 ("The Flying Eave")
 惹火 ("Hot")
 狂草 ("Infurious Grass")
 Instrumental 2
 冰心 ("Icy Heart")
 面書 ("Facebook")
 可可 ("Cocoa")
 妮歌(“Nicole", a song for Anita Mui)
 Instrumental 3
 金剛經 ("The Diamond Sutra")
 舊約 (青山變奏)(The Old Testament [Green Mountain Orchestra Mix])

MV DVD
Included with the album.
 舊約 ("The Old Testament") music video
 金剛經music video

Notes
 3 COLORS (Red, White, Black) are available. 
 Limited First Press version comes in a special-design disc case shaped like the SuperGoo logo, which houses the extra gifts like a mini poster, stickers, and "The Diamond Sutra" flip book.

References

Denise Ho albums
2009 albums